Julie Sandstede (née Tarnowski) is an American politician and former member of the Minnesota House of Representatives. A member of the Minnesota Democratic–Farmer–Labor Party (DFL), she formerly represented District 6A in northeastern Minnesota.

Early life, education, and career
Sandstede was born and raised in Hibbing, Minnesota, where she graduated from Hibbing High School. She attended the College of St. Scholastica, graduating with a Bachelor of Arts in music education, and the University of Saint Mary, graduating with a master's degree in curriculum and instruction.

Sandstede is a music teacher, first teaching at Cromwell–Wright School in Cromwell, Minnesota and then at Virginia Public Schools. She is also a volunteer firefighter in Colvin Township, St. Louis County, Minnesota, co-president of the Virginia Education Association, president of the Iron Range Service Unit, chair of the Education Minnesota professional advocacy committee, director of the Hibbing City Band, member of the Mesabi Symphony Orchestra and the Hibbing Alumni Band, and a Vacation Bible School volunteer.

Minnesota House of Representatives
Sandstede was elected to the Minnesota House of Representatives in 2016. She opposes abortion.

Personal life
Sandstede and her husband, Evan, have three children and reside in Hibbing. She is a member and choir director at Chisholm Baptist Church.

References

External links

 Official House of Representatives website
 Official campaign website

Living people
Democratic Party members of the Minnesota House of Representatives
21st-century American politicians
21st-century American women politicians
Women state legislators in Minnesota
Year of birth missing (living people)
Hibbing High School alumni